Jodi Proznick (born October 23, 1975) is a Canadian jazz bassist, composer, educator and producer. In 2019, she was named Jazz Artist of the Year at the Western Canadian Music Awards and has been nominated for three Juno Awards. She was a recipient of the Lieutenant Governor's Arts and Music Awards in 2022 for her contribution to music education in British Columbia.

Career
Proznick began playing double bass when she was thirteen and was taught by her father, musician and educator David Proznick. While attending Semiahmoo Secondary, she won the General Motors Award of Excellence in 1993. She attended McGill University from 1993 to 1998, where she met future collaborators such as pianist Tilden Webb, drummer Jesse Cahill and tenor saxophonist Steve Kaldestad, who would form the Jodi Proznick Quartet. While in Montreal, she also worked with Christine Jensen, Kelly Jefferson, Ranee Lee, André White, Greg Clayton and many other prominent Montreal jazz artists. She was a winner of the IAJE Sisters in Jazz Competition in 1998.

Proznick moved from Montreal to Vancouver in 2000, and married jazz pianist Tilden Webb. The two became leading members of the Vancouver jazz scene, and signed to the Cellar Live record label. Over the years, Jodi has appeared on and produced numerous records. 

Jodi took a master's degree from 2004 to 2005 in Art Education at Simon Fraser University. There, she met mentor and frequent collaborator, Celeste Snowber, whom Proznick has worked with on two shows: Woman Giving Birth to a Red Pepper in 2013 and Perfect Imperfections: The Art of a Messy Life in 2018.

In 2004, the Jodi Proznick Quartet received the Galaxie Rising Star Award at the Vancouver International Jazz Festival. Soon after, Proznick begun work on her first solo record, Foundations, alongside her quartet. The album released in 2006 to critical acclaim, including Album of the Year and Acoustic Group of the Year at the 2008 National Jazz Awards, and a Juno nomination for Traditional Jazz Album of the Year. Proznick also won Bassist of the Year at the National Jazz Awards in 2008 and 2009.

As a member of the Oliver Gannon Quartet in 2004, Proznick was the opening act for Oscar Peterson. She has been a featured performer with the Vancouver Symphony Orchestra, the Vancouver Chamber Choir, the Elektra Women's Choir, and the Vancouver Bach Family of Choirs. She accompanied Michael Bublé in the closing ceremonies and soundtrack of the 2010 Vancouver Olympic Winter Games.

In 2008, she co-founded Triology, alongside guitarist Bill Coon and pianist Miles Black. Their self-titled debut album, Triology, released the same year, and was Proznick's second album as a leader. The group continues to play regularly.

In 2017, Proznick released her third solo album, Sun Songs, which recounts the personal struggle that ensued after her mother's diagnosis of early onset dementia, as well as the arrival of her firstborn son. The album explores themes of life and death, polarity and love. The album features her husband Tilden Webb on piano, brother-in-law Jesse Cahill on drums, Steve Kaldestad on tenor saxophone, and jazz artist/CBC Radio host Laila Biali on vocals. The album was nominated for Vocal Jazz Album of the Year at the 2019 Juno Awards.

Triology: Stairway to the Stars released in 2019 as the band's second release and Proznick's fourth album as a leader.

In addition to the Jodi Proznick Quartet and Triology, Proznick is a member of the Tilden Webb Trio, the Joel Haynes Trio, the Oliver Gannon Quartet, and The High Standards Quintet. She is a frequent collaborator with pianist and educator Amanda Tosoff. She has also worked with musicians such as Michael Buble, Sarah McLachlan, George Coleman, Sheila Jordan, David "Fathead" Newman, Bill Henderson, Harold Mabern, Michael Feinstein, Ed Thigpen, Seamus Blake, George Colligan, Eddie Daniels, Peter Bernstein, Eddie Henderson, Ingrid Jensen, Ryan Kisor, Kitty Margolis, Charles McPherson, Byron Stripling, Bucky Pizzarelli, Jeff Hamilton, Mark Murphy, Eric Alexander, Lewis Nash, Houston Person, Jim Rotondi, Laila Biali, Brian Dickinson, Phil Dwyer, Kirk MacDonald, Celso Machado, Ian McDougall, Ron Paley, Don Thompson, Guido Basso, P. J. Perry, Dee Daniels and Sal Fererras. She has been featured on over 40 recordings as a side person.

Proznick was involved in teaching early childhood music classes for over 15 years. Her methodology included a combination of Orff, Kodaly, Dalcroze, Montessori and Suzuki philosophies of music education. Proznick taught at Capilano University from 2003 to 2013. From 2012 to 2019, she was a faculty member at Kwantlen Polytechnic University, where she taught improvisation, jazz theory, jazz history, popular music history, rudiments, jazz combo and bass lessons. From 2019 to 2020, she was the Manager of Education and Community Outreach for the Vancouver Symphony Orchestra. 

She is currently the Head of the Jazz Department at the Vancouver Symphony Orchestra School of Music and Artistic Director of the VSO School of Music Summer Jazz Workshop. She also teaches jazz bass, combos and jazz theory. She has been a guest adjudicator and clinician at many festivals, colleges, universities, and conferences across Canada, such as the Banff Centre for Arts and Creativity. Proznick is the Co-Founder and Co-Artistic Director of online music education platform Music Arts Collective, alongside Amanda Tosoff and arts administrator Francesca Fung. 

She collaborated in 2021 with the Vancouver Chinese Music Ensemble, along with Bill Coon and James Danderfer. The project is a fusion of jazz with traditional and contemporary Chinese music. An album is expected in late 2022. 

Proznick formed the Ostara Project in 2022 with Amanda Tosoff, an all-female jazz supergroup. The project’s first album will consist of Proznick and Tosoff alongside Allison Au, Rachel Therrien, Jocelyn Gould, Joanna Majoko and Sanah Kadoura. Their debut album is set to release in fall of 2022, alongside two singles. It will be Proznick's fifth album as a co-leader. 

In 2022, Proznick was a recipient of the Lieutenant Governor's Arts and Music Awards, for her contribution to the arts community and music education in British Columbia.

Awards and honors

Discography

As leader or co-leader
 2006 – Foundations – Jodi Proznick Quartet
 2014 – Triology – Triology (co-led with Miles Black and Bill Coon)
 2017 – Sun Songs – Jodi Proznick Quartet ft. Laila Biali
 2019 – Triology: Stairway to the Stars – Triology (co-led with Miles Black and Bill Coon)
 2022 – The Ostara Project – The Ostara Project (co-led with Amanda Tosoff)
 (Upcoming) 2022 – Jasmine Jazz – Vancouver Chinese Music Ensemble ft. Jodi Proznick Trio

As sidewoman  
 1998 – Something Personal – The McGill Jazz Orchestra Directed by Gordon Foote
 1999 – Realtime – Sienna Dahlen
 2002 – Little Temptations – Sienna Dahlen
 2003 – Live at the Cellar – Charles McPherson Quartet
 2004 – Cellar Groove – Tilden Webb Trio with David Fathead Newman
 2005 – The Time Is Now – Joel Haynes Trio
 2005 - Live from Lotus Land – Mike Rud
 2006 – Run with It – James Danderfer Group
 2006 – Cellar Live: The First Five Years - Various Artists (Compilation)
 2006 – CBC's Hot Air, Vol. 4 – Various Artists (Compilation)
 2007 – Chances Are – Jane Fair
 2007 – Feel This – Kia Kadiri
 2007 – Contemplation – Christie Grace
 2008 – No Boundaries – Bill Coon and Ron Peters
 2008 – Transitions – Joel Haynes Trio with Seamus Blake
 2008 – Live at the Cellar, Vol. 1 – George Evans
 2008 – It's Always You – Luis Geraldo
 2009 – Memory Cafe – Steve Maddock
 2009 – Fresh – Bria Skonberg
 2009 – Low Down, West Broadway – Joe Coughlin
 2009 – Rocky Mountain Jazz Compilation – Various Artists (Compilation)
 2009 – Too Much to Do – Nick La Riviere
 2010 – Sounds of Vancouver 2010: Opening Ceremony Commemorative Album – The 2010 Vancouver Olympic Orchestra
 2010 – Sounds of Vancouver 2010: Closing Ceremony Commemorative Album – The 2010 Vancouver Olympic Orchestra
 2010 – Blow-Up – Steve Kaldestad Quartet
 2010 – Chez Nous: Christmas with Elektra – Elektra Women's Choir
 2011 – Just Like That – Cory Weeds with the Tilden Webb Trio
 2011 – Down in the Bottom – The Night Crawlers with the Big Band Sound
 2011 – Anywhere But Here – Janice Finlay
 2012 – JazzSpeak – Ralf Buschmeyer
 2012 – Sunalta – Jon McCaslin
 2012 – Live at the Cellar – Amanda Tosoff
 2013 – Live at Cory Weeds' Cellar Jazz Club – Peter Bernstein with the Tilden Webb Trio
 2014 – Change Partners: Live at the Yardbird Suite – Champian Fulton
 2014 – Easy Sailing – Oliver Gannon Quartet
 2014 – Invitations – Jerrold Dubyk Quintet
 2015 – Trio3 YVR – Jon McCaslin
 2015 – Drinky – Tim Tamashiro
 2016 – This Bitter Earth – Jaclyn Guillou
 2017 – Keep Christmas With You – Katherine Penfold
 2018 – Step Up – Miles Black Quartet and David Rehorick
 2018 – Maybe This Christmas, Vol. 8 – Various Artists (Compilation)
 2019 – Justin Time for Christmas, Vol. 6 – Various Artists (Compilation)
 2019 – Loving Memory – Gary Macdonald
 2021 – Live @ Cory Weeds' Cellar Jazz Club – Joe Magnarelli and Gary Smulyan with the Tilden Webb Trio
 2021 – Tango-Klezmer-Jazz – Vetta Chamber Music (featuring Four Jays)
 2022 – Love for Connoisseurs – Angela Verbrugge

References

External links 
 Official website

Living people
1975 births
Musicians from British Columbia
People from Surrey, British Columbia
Canadian jazz double-bassists
McGill University alumni
Simon Fraser University alumni
Academic staff of Capilano University
21st-century double-bassists